Switzerland was represented by Mariella Farré, with the song "Io così non ci sto" at the 1983 Eurovision Song Contest which took place on April 23. Farré was the winner of the Swiss national final for the 1983 Contest, held on March 26.

Before Eurovision

Concours Eurovision 1983 
Swiss German broadcaster SF DRS was in charge of broadcasting the selection for the Swiss entry for the 1983 Contest. The national final was held at the studios of DRS in Zurich, hosted by Marie-Thérèse Gwerder. Hans Moeckel's Big Band accompanied the entries. Nine songs were submitted for the 1983 national final and the winning song was chosen by 3 regional juries, a press jury, and a jury of music experts. DRS and TSI announced their votes in a different order than usual due to technical difficulties. The interval act was American musical theatre performer Vivian Reed.

At Eurovision
On the night of the Contest, Farré performed eighth, following Spain and preceding Finland. At the close of voting "Io così non ci sto" had received 28 points, placing Switzerland in 15th place out of 20 entries, the country's worst placing since 1974. The Swiss jury awarded its 12 points to the Netherlands.

The Swiss conductor at the contest was Robert Weber.

Voting

References

External links
 Swiss National Final 1983

1983
Countries in the Eurovision Song Contest 1983
Eurovision